Papa Vegas is a rock band from the 1990s. They released two studio albums and were signed to RCA Records. 

Papa Vegas was founded in Grand Rapids, Michigan, where vocalist Joel Ferguson and guitarist Pete Dunning first began playing together. Dunning and Ferguson collaborated for three years before parting ways for individual projects, and Ferguson played under the name "Papa Vegas" with a variety of other musicians. After playing with Papa Vegas at a battle of the bands competition, they were heard by Brian Vander Ark, then lead singer of The Verve Pipe, who signed them to his Sid Flips label and produced their debut EP, Grounded, with Pete Dunning back on lead guitar, Scott Stefanski on drums, and original bassist Mick Force. Sid Flips was folded into RCA, and the group was set up with Don Gilmore to produce their debut full-length album. Tom Lord-Alge mixed; the result was released as Hello Vertigo in April 1999. All songs on the album were written by Joel Ferguson with the exception of "Sermon Underground", which was co-written by Joel Ferguson and Pete Dunning. Their biggest hit single was "Bombshell", which peaked at #20 on the Billboard Modern Rock Tracks chart in 1999. Following the album's release, they toured with the Verve Pipe and also Kent, a critically acclaimed band from Stockholm then touring the US under RCA's European label, and had a lesser hit with the release of "Something Wrong" but the full-length did not sell as well as hoped, and no further hit singles followed. The group was dropped from the RCA label in March 2000 and split up shortly afterward. In December 2004, the band reunited to play a large venue show with The Verve Pipe. The show was a success, and they repeated it in December 2005. Ferguson, Stefanski and Dunning re-grouped for various projects on and off in the years that followed, most notably Miles to Mars. Pete Dunning went on to play in the Grand Rapids groups Molly, White Rabbit And Barrel Bones while Scott Stefanski and Joel Ferguson played in The Verve Pipe. In January 2009 Papa Vegas re-grouped as a five piece with John Connors replacing Force on bass, and adding Randy Tate on keyboards. The band is currently playing shows in their home state of Michigan and is working on a forthcoming album to be released in early 2010 on their own Shiver Music label.

Personnel 
Joel Ferguson – vocals, guitars
Pete Dunning – backup vocals, guitars
Mick Force – bass guitar
Scott Stefanski – drums, backing vocals
Randy Tate1 – keyboards, vocals
John Conners1 – bass guitar, vocals
1 New members since band reformed in 2009.

Discography 
Grounded (EP) - 1997, Sid Flips
Bombshell - 3:48
Never - 3:26
Long Days - 3:34
Little Kisses (early version of "Something Wrong") - 2:52
Mesmerized - 3:35
Hello Vertigo - 1999, RCA Records
Something Wrong - 3:00
Bombshell - 3:59
Super Telepathy - 3:37
Mesmerized - 3:46
Long Days - 4:17
Reason Without Meaning - 4:37
No Destination - 3:51
Beautiful Animal - 2:58
Through To You - 3:07
Sermon Underground - 3:53
On Your Own - 3:53
Resolve - 4:13
Gravity Wars - 2011
Comfort - 3:49
Find Another Way - 3:16
She's Made of Stone - 3:54
Before Our Eyes - 3:28
Battle Hymn of the Fearless Yard Gnome - 2:27
Drained - 3:33
One I Left Behind - 3:38
Shoes - 3:42

References

Alternative rock groups from Michigan
American post-grunge musical groups
Musical groups disestablished in 2000
Musical groups reestablished in 2009